John Thomas Salley (born May 16, 1964) is an American former professional basketball player. He was the first player in NBA history to win championships with three franchises (since joined by Robert Horry, Danny Green, and LeBron James), as well as the first player in the NBA to win a championship in three different decades (since joined by Tim Duncan).

After being drafted in the first round out of Georgia Tech in the 1986 NBA draft, the -tall Salley played both power forward and center for the Detroit Pistons, Miami Heat, Toronto Raptors, Chicago Bulls, Panathinaikos and Los Angeles Lakers. He was a long-time host of the former Fox Sports Net show The Best Damn Sports Show Period. He is a vegan activist, chef, and wellness entrepreneur.

Early life and college career
Salley was born in Brooklyn, New York. Salley played on the basketball team at Canarsie High School in Brooklyn. He is a 1988 graduate of Georgia Tech's College of Management. He helped the Yellow Jackets win the 1985 ACC Championship, they also advanced to the Elite Eight of the NCAA Tournament. He left in 1986 as Tech's all-time leader in blocked shots. Salley holds Georgia Tech's personal fouls record, and has had his jersey number 22 retired, a very rare honor in college basketball.

Professional career

Detroit Pistons
Salley was drafted by the Detroit Pistons in the first round of the 1986 NBA draft out of Georgia Tech. After joining the Pistons, he became close friends with Adrian Dantley, who taught him proper nutrition, how to exercise, and how to conduct himself off the court. Salley, for his part, called Dantley "The Teacher". Salley would become good friends with comedian Eddie Murphy and made several appearances at comedy clubs in the off-season. In 1989 and 1990, he played on two Pistons NBA championship teams. He is among the Pistons' all-time leaders in blocked shots.

Under the coaching of Chuck Daly, Salley was part of the Pistons era that featured three consecutive NBA finals appearances.  The team's highly physical, defense-oriented, and dirty style of play earned them the nickname of the NBA's "Bad Boys", with Salley playing alongside Dennis Rodman, Bill Laimbeer, James Edwards, Joe Dumars, Isiah Thomas, Rick Mahorn and Dantley. After losing the 1988 NBA Finals in seven games to the Lakers, the Pistons turned it around to sweep the Lakers in four games in 1989. Salley and the Pistons repeated in 1990, defeating the Portland Trail Blazers in five games. The Pistons' run came to an end when the Michael Jordan-led Chicago Bulls swept them in four games in the 1991 Eastern Conference finals; following game four, while most of the Pistons players chose to return to the locker room rather than congratulate the new Eastern Conference champions, Salley was one of the few who stayed on the court as the game ended to congratulate the Bulls.

Miami Heat, Toronto Raptors
Salley was traded to the Miami Heat in 1992. In the 1995 NBA expansion draft he was selected by the inaugural Toronto Raptors team after being made available by the Heat.

In February 1996, he negotiated a buyout of his contract and was waived thus ending his stint with the Raptors during which he averaged 19.3 minutes and 6 points per game.

Chicago Bulls
Free of his Raptors contract, in early March 1996, Salley signed a 10-day contract with the Chicago Bulls, joining the roster with Michael Jordan, Scottie Pippen, Toni Kukoč, and former Pistons teammates Dennis Rodman and James Edwards. Following another 10-day contract right after the first one ended, the Bulls signed Salley as a free agent and he spent the rest of the season with the team. The 1995–96 Bulls achieved a record-breaking 72-win season, the best-ever regular-season record at the time, later surpassed by the 2015–16 Golden State Warriors at 73–9. Salley would win his third NBA championship in June, playing sparingly in the 1996 NBA Finals.

One month with Panathinaikos
In September 1996, thirty-two-year-old Salley came out of what turned out to be only a three-month retirement and went to play in Greece, where he joined the reigning EuroLeague champions Panathinaikos of the Greek Basket League on a one-year US$1 million contract. Before accepting the Božidar Maljković-coached Panathinaikos' offer, Salley had reportedly consulted with recent Bulls teammate Toni Kukoč who knew Maljković well having spent four trophy-laden seasons anchoring his late 1980s KK Split teams.

Salley made his Panathinaikos debut on September 25, 1996, in EuroLeague away at FC Barcelona, a 77–58 loss during which he scored 5 points before fouling out in only 12 minutes of action. Right away, Salley got on the bad side of coach Maljković who refused to modify his disciplinarian approach in order to accommodate a veteran player with a notable NBA career behind him. Though Salley's performances somewhat improved over the following three EuroLeague outings—10 points in a home loss versus ASVEL, 9 points and 11 rebounds in a blowout home win versus KK Split, and 21 points and 8 rebounds in a win away at minnows Bayer Leverkusen—as he seemingly showed signs of adjustment to FIBA basketball rules and European referees by managing to stay out of foul trouble, he continued to butt heads with coach Maljković. After flying back to Athens with the team the morning after the Leverkusen game, Salley refused to go to practice and as a result, got dropped by Maljković for their Greek League game the following day. The player then flew back to the United States for meetings with TV executives over a new talk show he had been planning to host for Disney, returning to Athens an hour before the club's Greek Cup game versus P.A.O.K. on October 22, 1996—a trip that included Salley renting a private Lear jet in Paris for US$20,000 out of his own pocket in order to make it back to Athens in time for the game after having his connecting flight delayed and then even renting a helicopter once he landed at Athens' Ellinikon Airport to take him right to Panathinaikos' OACA Hall in the city's Marousi neighbourhood. However, Maljković still refused to include him in the lineup and in response, Salley decided to leave Panathinaikos unilaterally two days later on October 24, 1996, after only a month at the club.

Salley appeared in seven games for Panathinaikos and ended up getting paid about €300,000.

Los Angeles Lakers
In 1999, Salley joined a Lakers team led by superstars Shaquille O'Neal and Kobe Bryant and also reunited with his former Bulls coach, Phil Jackson. He saw little action for the Lakers en route to their first of three consecutive NBA championships, primarily serving as O'Neal's backup. In 2000, he retired again following the first Lakers championship season after proudly proclaiming that he had won "four championship rings, with three different teams, in three different decades and two different millenniums". He would be the last Laker to wear #16 before Pau Gasol, whom it was retired in honor of. 14 years later, Tim Duncan of the San Antonio Spurs became the second player to achieve this (sans the requirement of different teams) by leading his Spurs to five championships between 1999 and 2014.

Post-basketball activities

Film
In 1995, John Salley had a role in Bad Boys as a thick-glassed computer hacking nerd who gets out of jail because he helps crack files for the Miami Police Department. In 1996, Salley appeared as a veteran basketball player alongside Whoopi Goldberg in the film Eddie, about a fan who takes over as coach of the New York Knicks.

In 2003, Salley reprised his role of Fletcher in Bad Boys II and appeared in the Showtime TV film Coast to Coast alongside actress Selma Blair.

He also appeared in the movie Confessions of a Shopaholic in 2009 as a member of the shopaholic help group (playing a retired NBA player) and had a bit role as a pimp in the blaxploitation spoof Black Dynamite.

Salley appeared in the Disney Channel original movie, The Ultimate Christmas Present, as a tall elf.

In 2018, Salley appeared in the Netflix original movie, Nappily Ever After, starring Sanaa Lathan.

In 2022, Salley appears in Sneakerella as a famous sneaker maker and former basketball star.

Television
In the fall of 1998, Salley hosted the game show I Can't Believe You Said That, which aired on the Fox Family Channel. During that time, he also guest-starred as a panelist on Hollywood Squares and Match Game.

In 2000, he appeared as himself in an episode of Sabrina the Teenage Witch. Appearing in the episode titled "Welcome Back Duke”. In the credits his character's name was just NBA player.

In 2001, he appeared as himself on a special TV Hosts episode of Weakest Link where he was the first contestant voted off.

In 2005, he appeared in the television series Noah's Arc as Victor.

He was one of the hosts of The Best Damn Sports Show Period on Fox Sports Network. Salley hosted The John Salley Block Party, a radio morning show on Los Angeles station 100.3 The Beat from 2005 – 2006.

For a short time, Salley provided analysis for NBC's NBA Showtime.

Salley has also hosted VH1's Basketball Wives (2010–2012) and Basketball Wives LA (2011, 2012, 2014, 2015) Reunion Specials.Starting from 2019, Salley reprised his role of Fletcher in the Bad Boys spinoff TV series LA's Finest.

Guest appearances
In 2001, he made an appearance in the Luther Vandross music video, "Take You Out". He also appeared on a celebrity episode of Weakest Link that same year and was voted off in the first round.

In 2004, he was part of the panel of celebrity judges in the TBS Superstation show He's a Lady.

In 2006, Salley was named the Commissioner of the American Basketball Association.

In 2007, Salley appeared in the ABC reality television series Fast Cars and Superstars: The Gillette Young Guns Celebrity Race, featuring a dozen celebrities in a stock car racing competition. In the first round of competition, Salley matched up against professional wrestler John Cena and tennis star Serena Williams. Salley also became the host of the BET show Ballers.

Salley joined the cast of the reality competition show I'm a Celebrity…Get Me out of Here!, which premiered on June 1, 2009. He came in third place behind winner Lou Diamond Phillips and runner-up Torrie Wilson.

Salley hosted a podcast on Adam Carolla's ACE Broadcasting Network with sportswriter Kevin Hench entitled Spider and the Henchman. The show was canceled on March 18, 2011.

In 2012, he appeared as a celebrity judge on RuPaul's Drag Race (season 4, episode 2).

On an episode of Bravo's Millionaire Matchmaker ("The NFL Kicker and the Workaholic", aired March 12, 2013), he acted as a consultant to Patti Stanger to help one of her clients (an ex-NFL player) become less of a "playa" and find a woman to settle down with.

 Vegan activism and wellness career 
Salley is a vegan activist and has appeared on PETA's testimonial videos, as well as in promoting alternatives to practices of massive factory farming.

Salley is also noted for speaking at Michigan's Vegfest since 2009 and appearing on VegMichigan's billboard campaign. He also appeared before the U.S. Congress to advocate for vegetarian options to be served in public schools in Nov ’09 and May ’10 as part of the Child Nutrition Act discussions.

On May 4, 2010, it was announced that Salley had joined the Simply Raw team. The group of individuals who produced the documentary Raw for 30 had approached Salley with their video about reversing diabetes, and "it instantly got his attention" since his father had the disease.

Salley teamed up with Farm Sanctuary in 2010 to host their New York City Walk for Farm Animals'' on Sunday, October 24, 2010.

In June 2012 Salley became the official spokesperson for a natural supplements line called VirMax that is developed by Natural Product Solutions, LLC.

In December 2015, Salley encouraged US First Lady Michelle Obama to go vegan "for the planet" – setting a lifestyle example of reducing environmental impacts from greenhouse gas release.

"Vegan eating is not just a slam dunk for human health; it's also the most effective way to combat climate change." ~ John Salley

Salley is an entrepreneur in the cannabis industry, launching his own cannabis brand Deuces22 and taking an ownership stake in the cannabis testing company GreenSpace Labs. Salley is also an advisory board member with cannabis social networking platform BudTrader.

Salley is an ambassador for Operation Smile.

Personal life 
Salley married Natasha Duffy in 1993, and they have two children together. He also has a daughter from a previous relationship. Salley is a member of Omega Psi Phi initiated through Nu Omega Chapter in Detroit.

NBA career statistics

Regular season 

|-
| style="text-align:left;"| 
| style="text-align:left;"|Detroit
| 82 || 2 || 17.8 || .562 || .000 || .614 || 3.6 || 0.7 || 0.5 || 1.5 || 5.3
|-
| style="text-align:left;"| 
| style="text-align:left;"|Detroit
| 82 || 16 || 24.4 || .566 || – || .709 || 4.9 || 1.4 || 0.6 || 1.7 || 8.5
|-
| style="text-align:left;background:#afe6ba;"|†
| style="text-align:left;"|Detroit
| 67 || 21 || 21.8 || .498 || .000 || .692 || 5.0 || 1.1 || 0.6 || 1.1 || 7.0
|-
| style="text-align:left;background:#afe6ba;"|  †
| style="text-align:left;"|Detroit
| 82 || 12 || 23.3 || .512 || .250 || .713 || 5.4 || 0.8 || 0.6 || 1.9 || 7.2
|-
| style="text-align:left;"| 
| style="text-align:left;"|Detroit
| 74 || 1 || 22.3 || .475 || .000 || .727 || 4.4 || 0.9 || 0.7 || 1.5 || 7.4
|-
| style="text-align:left;"| 
| style="text-align:left;"|Detroit
| 72 || 38 || 24.6 || .512 || .000 || .715 || 4.1 || 1.6 || 0.7 || 1.5 || 9.5
|-
| style="text-align:left;"| 
| style="text-align:left;"|Miami
| 51 || 34 || 27.9 || .502 || – || .799 || 6.1 || 1.6 || 0.6 || 1.4 || 8.3
|-
| style="text-align:left;"| 
| style="text-align:left;"|Miami
| 76 || 45 || 25.1 || .477 || .667 || .729 || 5.4 || 1.8 || 0.7 || 1.0 || 7.7
|-
| style="text-align:left;"| 
| style="text-align:left;"|Miami
| 75 || 50 || 26.1 || .499 || – || .739 || 4.5 || 1.6 || 0.6 || 1.1 || 7.3
|-
| style="text-align:left;"| 
| style="text-align:left;"|Toronto
| 25 || 6 || 19.3 || .486 || – || .723 || 3.9 || 1.6 || 0.4 || 0.5 || 6.0
|-
| style="text-align:left;background:#afe6ba;"|†
| style="text-align:left;"|Chicago
| 17 || 0 || 11.2 || .343 || – || .600 || 2.5 || 0.9 || 0.5 || 0.9 || 2.1
|-
| style="text-align:left;background:#afe6ba;"|†
| style="text-align:left;"|L.A. Lakers
| 45 || 3 || 6.7 || .362 || – || .750 || 1.4 || 0.6 || 0.2 || 0.3 || 1.6
|- class="sortbottom"
| style="text-align:center;" colspan="2"| Career
| 748 || 228 || 22.1 || .506 || .214 || .714 || 4.5 || 1.2 || 0.6 || 1.3 || 7.0

Playoffs 

|-
|style="text-align:left;"|1987
|style="text-align:left;"|Detroit
|15||0||20.7||.500||–||.643||4.8||0.7||0.2||1.1||6.2
|-
|style="text-align:left;"|1988
|style="text-align:left;"|Detroit
|23||0||27.1||.538||.000||.710||6.7||0.9||0.7||1.6||7.0
|-
| style="text-align:left;background:#afe6ba;"|1989†
|style="text-align:left;"|Detroit
|17||0||23.1||.586||–||.667||4.6||0.5||0.5||1.5||8.9
|-
| style="text-align:left;background:#afe6ba;"|1990†
|style="text-align:left;"|Detroit
|20||0||27.4||.475||–||.755||5.9||1.0||0.5||1.7||9.5
|-
|style="text-align:left;"|1991
|style="text-align:left;"|Detroit
|15||0||20.5||.543||–||.600||4.1||0.7||0.4||1.3||7.5
|-
|style="text-align:left;"|1992
|style="text-align:left;"|Detroit
|5||1||29.8||.455||.000||.821||6.0||2.8||0.6||2.8||12.6
|-
|style="text-align:left;"|1994
|style="text-align:left;"|Miami
|5||5||40.2||.386||–||.688||8.0||1.6||0.4||1.0||11.0
|-
| style="text-align:left;background:#afe6ba;"|1996†
|style="text-align:left;"|Chicago
|16||0||5.3||.545||–||.286||0.7||0.4||0.1||0.1||0.9
|-
| style="text-align:left;background:#afe6ba;"|2000†
|style="text-align:left;"|L.A. Lakers
|18||0||4.3||.385||–||.700||1.2||0.2||0.1||0.3||0.9
|- class="sortbottom"
| style="text-align:center;" colspan="2"| Career
| 134 || 6 || 20.1 || .505 || .000 || .690 || 4.4 || 0.8 || 0.4 || 1.2 || 6.4

See also
 List of NBA players with most championships

References

External links

John Salley NBA stats @ basketball-reference.com
FOX Sports: The Scoop On John Salley

1964 births
Living people
African-American basketball players
African-American male actors
African-American television personalities
All-American college men's basketball players
American expatriate basketball people in Canada
American expatriate basketball people in Greece
American game show hosts
American male film actors
American men's basketball players
American sports radio personalities
American male television actors
American veganism activists
Basketball players from New York City
Businesspeople in the cannabis industry
Canarsie High School alumni
Centers (basketball)
Chicago Bulls players
Detroit Pistons draft picks
Detroit Pistons players
Georgia Tech Yellow Jackets men's basketball players
Greek Basket League players
Los Angeles Lakers players
Miami Heat players
National Basketball Association broadcasters
Panathinaikos B.C. players
Participants in American reality television series
People from Canarsie, Brooklyn
Power forwards (basketball)
Sportspeople from Brooklyn
Toronto Raptors expansion draft picks
Toronto Raptors players
21st-century African-American people
20th-century African-American sportspeople
21st-century American male actors
20th-century American male actors